In Greek mythology, Lapithes (Ancient Greek: Λαπίθης) may refer to the following figures:

 Lapithes, son of Apollo and Stilbe. He and his full brother Centaurus were believed to have given their names to the legendary races of Lapiths and Centaurs respectively. Lapithes settled on the banks of River Peneus and married Orsinome, daughter of Eurynomus, by whom he became the father of Phorbas, Periphas, Triopas (possibly) and Diomede.
 Lapithes, son of Aeolus (son of Hippotes) and father of Lesbus, who married Methymna, daughter of Macareus, and gave his name to the island of Lesbos.

Notes

References 

 Diodorus Siculus, The Library of History translated by Charles Henry Oldfather. Twelve volumes. Loeb Classical Library. Cambridge, Massachusetts: Harvard University Press; London: William Heinemann, Ltd. 1989. Vol. 3. Books 4.59–8. Online version at Bill Thayer's Web Site
 Diodorus Siculus, Bibliotheca Historica. Vol 1-2. Immanel Bekker. Ludwig Dindorf. Friedrich Vogel. in aedibus B. G. Teubneri. Leipzig. 1888–1890. Greek text available at the Perseus Digital Library.
 Pausanias, Description of Greece with an English Translation by W.H.S. Jones, Litt.D., and H.A. Ormerod, M.A., in 4 Volumes. Cambridge, MA, Harvard University Press; London, William Heinemann Ltd. 1918. Online version at the Perseus Digital Library
 Pausanias, Graeciae Descriptio. 3 vols. Leipzig, Teubner. 1903.  Greek text available at the Perseus Digital Library.

Children of Apollo
Demigods in classical mythology
Lapiths in Greek mythology